Dr. Ken is an American multi-camera sitcom created, written, and co-executive produced by its lead actor, Ken Jeong, who based the concept on his experience as a doctor prior to becoming a stand-up comedian. The ABC Studios/Sony Pictures Television co-production was picked up to series on May 7, 2015, and debuted on ABC on October 2, 2015. On October 20, 2015, ABC ordered a full season of 22 episodes for the first season. The series was renewed for a second and final season on May 12, 2016, which premiered on September 23, 2016.

Series overview

Episodes

Season 1 (2015–16)

Season 2 (2016–17)

Ratings

Notes

References

External links

Lists of American sitcom episodes